Turtledove General Delivery is a 1952 West German comedy film directed by Gerhard T. Buchholz and starring Horst Niendorf, Barbara Rütting and Heinz Schacht. The title is a reference to the Poste restante mail service, which is used as a contract point by the film's characters. The film portrays a number of residents of East Germany who decide to escape to the West.

Cast

References

Bibliography 
 Hans-Michael Bock and Tim Bergfelder. The Concise Cinegraph: An Encyclopedia of German Cinema. Berghahn Books, 2009.

External links 
 

1952 films
1952 comedy films
German comedy films
West German films
1950s German-language films
Films directed by Gerhard T. Buchholz
Cold War films
Films critical of communism
German black-and-white films
1950s German films